My Other People is the second studio album by English post-punk band, TV Priest. The album was released on 17 June 2022 through Sub Pop Records.

Background 
On 29 March 2022, the band announced their second album, along with the single "Bury Me in My Shoes". In an interview with Paste, lead singer Charlie Drinkwater said, "My Other People is a more 'open' set of songs, both musically and in our themes; in the process of writing we found ourselves talking about things other than anger or aggression. We wanted to discuss love, loss and joy too. It's a record about personal disintegration and destruction, but also rebuilding again after this. It's also heavily rooted in place, the music being a very direct response to Britain and England in 2021, but in a more abstract and textural sense."

Critical reception 

My Other People received mixed reviews from contemporary music critics. On review aggregator website, Metacritic, My Other People has an average rating of 67 out of 100 indicating "generally favorable reviews".

Track listing

References

External links 
 My Other People on Bandcamp
 

2022 albums
Sub Pop albums
TV Priest albums